The 2008 Fianna Fáil leadership election began on 2 April 2008, when party leader and Taoiseach Bertie Ahern announced his resignation. Brian Cowen, the Tánaiste and Minister for Finance was the clear favourite to succeed him.

Candidates

Standing
Brian Cowen – Tánaiste and Minister for Finance

Declined to stand
Dermot Ahern – Minister for Foreign Affairs
Mary Hanafin – Minister for Education and Science
Micheál Martin – Minister for Enterprise, Trade and Employment
Brian Lenihan – Minister for Justice, Equality and Law Reform

Outcome
On 2 April Mary Hanafin declined to comment on whether she would be standing for the leadership and Brian Lenihan had ruled himself out of the race. By 4 April all of the Fianna Fáil cabinet ministers had declared their support for the candidacy of Brian Cowen. No other candidate emerged, and Cowen was elected unopposed as the seventh leader of Fianna Fáil on 9 April 2008.

References

2008 elections in the Republic of Ireland
2008 in Irish politics
Brian Cowen
History of Fianna Fáil
Fianna Fáil leadership elections
Fianna Fáil leadership election